The genus Actinomadura is one of four genera of Actinomycetota that belong to the family Thermomonosporaceae.  It contains aerobic, Gram-positive, non-acid-fast, non-motile, chemo-organotrophic actinomycetes that produce well-developed, non-fragmenting vegetative mycelia and aerial hyphae that differentiate into surface-ornamented spore chains. These chains are of various lengths and can be straight, hooked or spiral. The genus currently comprises over 70 species with validly published names with standing in nomenclature, although the species status of some strains remains uncertain, and further comparative studies are needed.

Members of the genus are not characterized chemotaxonomically by type III/B cell walls (meso-diaminopimelic acid and madurose are present) with peptidoglycan structures of the acetyl type. The predominant menaquinone types are MK-9(H4), MK-9(H6) and MK-9(H8). The phospholipid pattern is PI (diphosphatidylglycerol and phosphatidylinositol are present as major phospholipids) and the fatty acid pattern is type 3a (branched saturated and unsaturated fatty acids plus tuberculostearic acid).

Species
Actinomadura comprises the following species:

 Actinomadura adrarensis Lahoum et al. 2016

 Actinomadura alba Wang et al. 2007
 "Actinomadura albolutea" Tohyama et al. 1984
 Actinomadura algeriensis Lahoum et al. 2017
 Actinomadura alkaliterrae Ay et al. 2017

 Actinomadura apis Promnuan et al. 2011
 Actinomadura atramentaria Miyadoh et al. 1987

 "Actinomadura azurea" Nakamura and Isono 1983
 Actinomadura bangladeshensis Ara et al. 2008
 Actinomadura barringtoniae Rachniyom et al. 2018
 "Actinomadura brunnea" Patel et al. 1987

 Actinomadura catellatispora Lu et al. 2003

 Actinomadura chibensis Hanafy et al. 2008
 Actinomadura chokoriensis Ara et al. 2008
 Actinomadura citrea Lavrova et al. 1972 (Approved Lists 1980)
 Actinomadura coerulea Preobrazhenskaya et al. 1975 (Approved Lists 1980)

 Actinomadura craniellae Li et al. 2019
 Actinomadura cremea Preobrazhenskaya et al. 1975 (Approved Lists 1980)
 Actinomadura darangshiensis Lee and Kim 2015
 "Actinomadura dassonvillei" (Brocq-Rousseau 1904) Lechevalier and Lechevalier 1970
 Actinomadura decatromicini Songsumanus et al. 2021
 Actinomadura deserti Cao et al. 2018

 Actinomadura fibrosa Mertz and Yao 1990

 Actinomadura flavalba Qin et al. 2009

 Actinomadura formosensis (Hasegawa et al. 1986) Zhang et al. 1998
 Actinomadura fulvescens Terekhova et al. 1987
 Actinomadura gamaensis Abagana et al. 2016
 Actinomadura geliboluensis Sazak et al. 2012
 Actinomadura glauciflava Lu et al. 2003

 Actinomadura hallensis Lee and Jeong 2006

 Actinomadura hankyongensis corrig. Siddiqi et al. 2019
 Actinomadura harenae Hu et al. 2020

 Actinomadura hibisca Tomita et al. 1991
 Actinomadura jiaoheensis Zhao et al. 2016
 Actinomadura keratinilytica Puhl et al. 2009
 Actinomadura kijaniata Horan and Brodsky 1982
 Actinomadura latina Trujillo and Goodfellow 1997
 Actinomadura lepetitiana Dalmastri et al. 2020

 Actinomadura litoris Cao et al. 2021
 Actinomadura livida Lavrova and Preobrazhenskaya 1975 (Approved Lists 1980)
 Actinomadura logoneensis Shi et al. 2019

 Actinomadura luteofluorescens (Shinobu 1962) Preobrazhenskaya et al. 1975 (Approved Lists 1980)
 "Actinomadura luzonensis" Tomita et al. 1980
 Actinomadura macra (ex Celmer et al. 1979) Huang 1980
 Actinomadura macrotermitis Benndorf et al. 2020
 Actinomadura madurae (Vincent 1894) Lechevalier and Lechevalier 1970 (Approved Lists 1980)
 "Actinomadura maheshkhaliensis" Ara et al. 2008

 "Actinomadura melliaura" Matson et al. 1989
 Actinomadura meridiana Lee 2012
 Actinomadura mexicana Quintana et al. 2004
 Actinomadura meyerae corrig. Quintana et al. 2004

 Actinomadura miaoliensis Tseng et al. 2009
 Actinomadura montaniterrae Songsumanus et al. 2016
 Actinomadura namibiensis Wink et al. 2003
 Actinomadura napierensis Cook et al. 2005
 Actinomadura nitritigenes Lipski and Altendorf 1995
 Actinomadura oligospora Mertz and Yao 1986
 "Actinomadura parvosata" Christensen et al. 1987
 Actinomadura pelletieri (Laveran 1906) Lechevalier and Lechevalier 1970 (Approved Lists 1980)
 Actinomadura physcomitrii Zhuang et al. 2020

 "Actinomadura pulveracea" Iwami et al. 1985

 Actinomadura rayongensis Phongsopitanun et al. 2015

 Actinomadura rhizosphaerae Malisorn et al. 2018
 Actinomadura rifamycini (Gauze et al. 1987) Promnuan et al. 2011
 Actinomadura roseirufa Wieme et al. 2019

 "Actinomadura routienii" Huang 1987

 Actinomadura rubrisoli Ay 2021

 Actinomadura rubteroloni Benndorf et al. 2020
 Actinomadura rudentiformis Le Roes and Meyers 2007
 Actinomadura rugatobispora Miyadoh et al. 1991
 Actinomadura rupiterrae Lee 2012

 Actinomadura scrupuli Lee and Lee 2010
 Actinomadura sediminis He et al. 2012
 Actinomadura soli Saricaoglu et al. 2021

 "Actinomadura spiculosospora" Koguchi et al. 1986
 "Actinomadura spinosa" Saitoh et al. 1993

 Actinomadura sporangiiformans Zhao et al. 2016
 Actinomadura sputi Yassin et al. 2010
 Actinomadura syzygii Rachniyom et al. 2015

 Actinomadura verrucosospora Nonomura and Ohara 1971 (Approved Lists 1980)
 Actinomadura vinacea Lavrova and Preobrazhenskaya 1975 (Approved Lists 1980)
 Actinomadura violacea Kanchanasin et al. 2021
 Actinomadura viridilutea (Agre and Guzeva 1975) Zhang et al. 2001
 Actinomadura viridis (Nonomura and Ohara 1971) Miyadoh et al. 1989
 Actinomadura xylanilytica Zucchi et al. 2013
 Actinomadura yumaensis Labeda et al. 1985

References

Actinomycetota
Bacteria genera